The 2019–20 season was Kasımpaşa Spor Kulübü's 99th year in existence. In addition to the domestic league, Kasımpaşa Spor Kulübü participated in the Turkish Cup.

Squad

Süper Lig

League table

Results summary

Results by round

Matches

Turkish Cup

Round of 16

|}

References

Kasımpaşa S.K. seasons
Turkish football clubs 2019–20 season